WBRE-TV (channel 28) is a television station licensed to Wilkes-Barre, Pennsylvania, United States, serving Northeastern Pennsylvania as an affiliate of NBC. It is owned by Nexstar Media Group, which provides certain services to Scranton-licensed CBS affiliate WYOU (channel 22) under a shared services agreement (SSA) with Mission Broadcasting. The two stations share studios on South Franklin Street in downtown Wilkes-Barre, with a news bureau and sales office next to WYOU's former studios on Lackawanna Avenue in downtown Scranton. WBRE-TV's transmitter is located at the Penobscot Knob antenna farm near Mountain Top.

WBRE-TV operates a digital replacement translator on UHF channel 28 that is licensed to Waymart with a transmitter in Forest City. It exists because wind turbines run by NextEra Energy Resources at the Waymart Wind Farm interfere with the transmission of full-power television signals.

History
WBRE signed on New Year's Day 1953 becoming the first television station in the market. It was owned by the Baltimore family along with WBRE radio (1340 AM, now WYCK, and 98.5 FM, now WKRZ). Although it appears that the call letters stand for Wilkes-Barre, they actually refer to Baltimore Radio Exchange, the Baltimore family's company. The radio stations were sold off in 1980.

For much of its early history, channel 28 was unable to get a direct feed from NBC because AT&T microwave and wireline operations weren't available in northeast Pennsylvania. Station engineers were thus forced to switch to and from the signals of network flagship WNBT in New York City (now WNBC) and WPTZ in Philadelphia (now CBS owned-and-operated station KYW-TV) when NBC programming was airing. WPTZ was used as a backup. In efforts to improve the quality and reliability of the received signals, WBRE built its own relay site on Pimple Hill on the west side of Route 115, just south of Pocono Raceway. Reception of the New York stations is very clear and reliable from that site; indeed, it served as a microwave retransmission site for many of the area's cable systems well into the 1990s until fiber optics made microwave transmission obsolete.

In 1972, disaster struck at WBRE when its offices were flooded by Hurricane Agnes. Most of the station's equipment was moved above ground and survived but a film archive in the basement was destroyed. The Baltimore family sold the radio stations in 1980, but held onto channel 28 until selling it to New York-based Northeastern Television Investors in 1984, earning a handsome return on their original investment in WBRE radio in 1925. Northeastern Television Investors in turn sold it to Adams Communications in 1989. Current owner Nexstar Broadcasting Group acquired the station in 1997. Nexstar already owned WYOU but opted to keep WBRE and sold WYOU to Mission Broadcasting. However, Nexstar continues to control WYOU's operations through a joint sales agreement. On January 3, 2007, Nexstar named Louis J. Abitabilo as vice president and general manager for the two stations.

The station's news operation made a fictional appearance within the NBC comedy series The Office, set in Scranton, in the 6th-season episodes "The Chump" and "Whistleblower", interviewing Michael Scott about reports of malfunctioning printers.

In September 2011, the station was evacuated once again due to potential flooding by heavy rains from Tropical Storm Lee. For 48 hours, the station operated remotely out of the garage of the local Fox affiliate, WOLF-TV. They provided coverage for the entire duration of the evacuation period, nearly 63 hours. Luckily, the station and the majority of the city of Wilkes-Barre were protected by the levee system.

On January 19, 2012, Nexstar named Robert G. Bee as vice president and general manager of WBRE, with management responsibilities for WYOU. The station went full HD including news and production on April 2, 2012.

On December 3, 2018, Nexstar announced it would acquire the assets of Chicago-based Tribune Media—which has operated WNEP-TV through a shared services agreement with Dreamcatcher Broadcasting since December 2014—for $6.4 billion in cash and debt. Nexstar is precluded from acquiring WNEP directly or indirectly, as FCC regulations prohibit common ownership of more than two stations in the same media market, or two or more of the four highest-rated stations in the market. As such, Nexstar will be required to sell either WNEP or both WBRE and WYOU (separately as it would break the grandfathered LMA) to separate, unrelated companies to address the ownership conflict. On January 31, 2019, Nexstar announced that it would retain the WBRE/WYOU duopoly and sell WNEP to another buyer; it was announced on March 20, 2019, that WNEP would be sold to Tegna Media. Since Nexstar will keep the WBRE/WYOU virtual duopoly, the transaction will make them sister stations to MyNetworkTV affiliate WPHL-TV in Philadelphia and ABC affiliate WIVT in Binghamton; Nexstar could also not keep CW affiliate WPIX in New York City due to the company's ownership cap, and that station would be consequently sold to the E. W. Scripps Company in a separate deal (Nexstar announced that it would transfer an option to repurchase WPIX to WYOU owner Mission Broadcasting, who would exercise that option. The sale was competed on December 30, 2020, with Nexstar operating the station through a Local Marketing Agreement.)

Programming

Syndicated programming
Syndicated programming on WBRE as of January 2022 includes Wheel of Fortune, Jeopardy!, The Drew Barrymore Show, and The Good Dish.

News operation

WBRE led the ratings for most of the 1950s until ABC affiliate WNEP-TV jumped ahead in 1959. During the 1950s and 1960s, mirroring the century-long rivalry between Scranton and Wilkes-Barre, WBRE ruled Wilkes-Barre while WDAU-TV (now WYOU) dominated Scranton. Channel 28 jumped back in the lead in the early-1960s and went back and forth for first place with WDAU until 1978 when WNEP took the lead. It fell to third for most of the 1980s, even with NBC's powerhouse prime time lineup. In the mid-1990s, the station briefly surpassed long-dominant WNEP, then fell again to second after the sale to Nexstar.

In 2002, WBRE and WYOU dropped their separate weekday morning and noon newscasts in favor of Pennsylvania Morning and Pennsylvania Midday which were jointly-produced and simulcast on both stations. Since the two have both trailed WNEP in the news ratings by a wide margin for most of the last thirty years, a major shakeup in format occurred in fall 2006. While WYOU went with a talk/debate format for its weeknight shows, WBRE News became more of the traditional news program. This set a more clear competition against WNEP. At the beginning of 2008, WYOU dropped the weekday shared productions and started airing the first hour of the nationally syndicated morning show The Daily Buzz at 6 while debuting its own noon news.

On June 9, 2008, there were several more changes made on the two stations. WBRE re-launched its news operation as WBRE Eyewitness News. It had previously used the Eyewitness News moniker from the mid-1980s until 2001. This coincided with news set, music package, graphics, and weather system upgrades. There were also some on-air personnel changes. Anchor Andy Mehalshick became a weeknight field anchor. Candice Kelly, who had been anchoring on WYOU, moved to the weeknight newscasts on WBRE back in mid-May and was joined by newcomer Drew Speier. In addition, WBRE and WYOU's midday shows switched anchors. Mark Hiller moved from WBRE to WYOU while Eva Mastromatteo switched over to this station. Hiller also debuted as anchor of WYOU News First at 4 on weeknights. That station became the first in the area to broadcast local news at that time. This was followed at 4:30 by The Insider which moved from its 7 o'clock slot. WYOU then dropped its 5 p.m. newscast and aired two episodes of Judge Judy. Finally weeknights at 6 o'clock, Lyndall Stout (who anchored on WBRE) joined Eric Scheiner for the half-hour WYOU Inter@ctive. That station also launched a new weeknight newscast, WYOU News at 7. WNEP already aired local news at that time on weeknights. All of the preceding changes were an attempt to better compete against WNEP and get more ratings.

On April 4, 2009, WYOU shut down its news operation resulting in the layoff of fourteen personnel while others were integrated with WBRE. Syndicated programming began airing in place of the newscasts. The station saved nearly $1 million a year as a result of closing down its news department.

Fox affiliate WOLF-TV (channel 56) dropped WNEP as their news supplier at the end of 2009. WOLF then went to WBRE to take over starting January 1, 2010. WBRE then took over production of nightly prime time broadcasts on WOLF-TV which expanded to an hour and were re-branded as Fox 56 News First at 10.

WBRE launched a new 4 p.m. show called PA Live in the fall of 2011. It focuses on lifestyles news covering the greater Wilkes-Barre and Scranton area. Along with its main studios, WBRE operates four news bureaus: Scranton (on Lackawanna Avenue), Stroudsburg (Main Street), Williamsport (on Pine Street), and Hazleton (East 10th Street).

On April 2, 2012, WBRE began broadcasting its local newscasts in high definition, with a new news set, HD cameras and forecasting equipment. With the upgrade, the station began producing half-hour newscasts at noon and 7 p.m. on sister station WYOU, the first such newscasts on that station since WYOU's in-house news department folded in 2009; those newscasts are also broadcast in high definition; in addition, simulcasts of WBRE's weekday morning, and nightly 6 and 11 p.m. newscasts are also carried on WYOU. This is a similar operation to existing joint news operations formed by Nexstar/Mission stations the year prior, between WUTR and WFXV in Utica, New York, and WTVW and WEHT in Evansville, Indiana.

Technical information

Subchannels
The station's digital signal is multiplexed:

On June 15, 2016, Nexstar announced that it has entered into an affiliation agreement with Katz Broadcasting for the Escape, Laff, Grit, and Bounce TV networks (the last one of which is owned by Bounce Media LLC, whose COO Jonathan Katz is president/CEO of Katz Broadcasting), bringing the four networks to 81 stations owned and/or operated by Nexstar, including WBRE-TV and WYOU.

Analog-to-digital conversion
WBRE-TV shut down its analog signal, over UHF channel 28, on February 17, 2009, the original target date in which full-power television stations in the United States were to transition from analog to digital broadcasts under federal mandate (which was later pushed back to June 12, 2009). The station's digital signal remained on its pre-transition VHF channel 11. Through the use of PSIP, digital television receivers display the station's virtual channel as its former UHF analog channel 28.

Translator

Like other stations in the area, WBRE was forced to rely on repeaters to serve its coverage area for most of its history. The market is one of the largest (in land area) east of the Mississippi River and is very mountainous. In addition, Scranton/Wilkes-Barre was a "UHF island" before the digital transition because it is too close to Philadelphia and New York City for VHF analog service. During March 2010, in a cost-cutting move, all owned and operated translators were shut down after Nexstar determined that its VHF signal for WBRE is adequate enough to reach most of the market. VHF signals "bend" over rugged terrain more easily than UHF signals. According to nepahdtv.com, this move was met with some dismay from viewers in areas where reception of signals from Penobscot Knob is difficult if not impossible, leaving many people in rural areas unable to watch the station. Many of these areas are among the few in the country where cable and satellite aren't readily available. Despite this, no effort from Nexstar has been made to bring back any of the repeaters.

Out-of-market cable coverage
In New York State, WBRE is carried on Charter Spectrum in Highland Lake and Monticello in Sullivan County, which are part of the New York City market.

As fill-in for other NBC affiliates during disputes
 During a retransmission dispute involving Smith Media station WKTV, WBRE-TV was seen on Time Warner Cable in the Utica, New York area from December 16, 2010, until January 8, 2011.
 At 11:59 a.m. on June 10, 2012, Time Warner Cable began broadcasting WBRE's programming in the Upstate NY region during a re-transmission dispute involving WPTZ, a station in Plattsburgh, New York owned by Hearst Television.
 On July 9, 2012, the dispute between Time Warner Cable and Hearst extended to other TWC systems; on TWC systems in the Piedmont Triad and Bright House Networks systems in Central Florida, WXII-TV and WESH, respectively, was replaced with WBRE; TWC and Bright House opted for such a distant signal like WBRE, as they do not have the rights to carry any NBC affiliate closest to them. However, Nexstar complained that Time Warner Cable has used their signals outside their markets without permission, while Time Warner Cable was within its rights to use their signals as replacements until a deal with Hearst is reached. The substitution of WBRE in place of WPTZ, WESH and WXII lasted until July 19, 2012, when the deal was reached between Hearst and TWC.

References

External links
PAHomepage.com – Official WBRE/WYOU-TV website

NBC network affiliates
Laff (TV network) affiliates
Grit (TV network) affiliates
True Crime Network affiliates
Television channels and stations established in 1953
1953 establishments in Pennsylvania
BRE-TV
Nexstar Media Group